Richard Davis (born 1965) is a British, social documentary and portrait photographer, based in North West England. His work has been promoted and exhibited by the British Culture Archive and photography publishers, Café Royal Books. A series of Davis' photographs of Hulme Crescents, from the 1980s are currently held at the John Rylands Research Institute and Library which is part of the University of Manchester.

Life and work 
Davis was born in Birmingham. He moved from Birmingham to study photography at Manchester Polytechnic (now Manchester Metropolitan University) in 1988. Whilst living in the city, he quickly started documenting life in the inner-city area of Hulme, its huge brutalist inspired concrete Crescents, as well as its many characters that inhabited the flats, many of which were squatters.

Davis also photographed stars of the Madchester scene as well as taking early portraits of comedians Steve Coogan and Caroline Aherne along with the poet Lemn Sissay.

Davis also photographed Nirvana live on their first tour of the United Kingdom in 1989, photoghraphs of which were used in the BBC Two documentary film, When Nirvana Came to Britain.

In the early 1990s Davis teamed up with author Steve Redhead to work on a project called Football With Attitude, his photographs making the links between music, football and fashion.

More recently, Davis made a series of portraits of Mancunians under the Mancunian Way, a document of life around Gravelly Hill Interchange, the original spaghetti junction, in Birmingham and a set of photographs capturing life in the coastal resort of Morecambe.

Publications

Books with others
 Football With Attitude, Wordsmith 1991 author Steve Redhead

Publications by Davis
 Hulme 1980's 90's, Café Royal, 2019
 The Mancunian Way, The Modernist Society, 2019
 Tales From The Second Cities Manchester 1980's, Café Royal, 2020
 Tales From The Second Cities Birmingham 1985–88, Café Royal, 2020
 Football Fans 1991, Café Royal, 2021
 The Madchester Years 1989–91, Café Royal, 2022

Exhibitions 
This Nations Saving Grace
Midlands Art Centre, Birmingham, 1989
Counter Image, Manchester, 1990
East Sussex Arts Tour (Brighton, Lewes, Crowborough), 1991

Entertainment UK
Cornerhouse Bar, Manchester, 1991
The Green Room, Manchester, 1991
Midlands Art Centre, Birmingham, 1991/92

Football With Attitude
Manto Cafe Bar, Manchester, 1991
Righton Building, Manchester Polytechnic, 1991

Manchester 88-92
The Book Room, Lancaster, 2009

Under Morecambe Skies
The Dukes, Lancaster, 2011
Lancaster Library, 2011
More Music, Morecambe, 2011
Storey Institute, Lancaster, 2011

Portraiture - Past & Present
More Music, Morecambe, 2012
The Dukes, Lancaster, 2013

Exhibitions with British Culture Archive
The Social, London, 2019/20 with photographers Tish Murtha and Rob Bremner
The Refuge, Manchester (The People's City), 2020 with photographers Peter Walsh and Rob Bremner
Sputnik Kino, Kreuzberg, Berlin (British Shorts), 2020/21 with photographers Tish Murtha and Rob Bremner

Streets in the Sky
More Music, Morecambe, 2021/22
Bonded Warehouse, Manchester (Photo North Festival), 2022

Collections 
Davis' work is held in the following permanent collections:
John Rylands Research Institute and Library, University of Manchester: 35 photographs taken in Hulme

References

General references 

Huckmag.com (Miss Rosen) - 19th April 2022 Gritty photos celebrating the Madchester years
Gigslutz - 22nd April 2022 REVIEW: Richard Davis Madchester years 89-91 book
Photo North Festival : Some of the stunning Images going on show - Manchester World (Andrew Noweli) - 22nd April 2022 
Manchester Evening News (Jenna Campbell) - 4th May 2022 A festival showcasing major photography talent is coming to Manchester
Manchester Evening News by Lee Grimsditch - 16th July 2022 Images of Hulme, Rusholme and Moss Side from the 'Poll Tax' era
Birmingham Mail by Thomas Fair - 1st July 2022 Late 80s snaps of Birmingham by Richard Davis

1965 births
Living people
Photographers from Birmingham, West Midlands
Photographers from Manchester